Nizhne-Chufichevo is a rural locality (a selo) in Starooskolsky District, Belgorod Oblast, Russia. The population was 120 as of 2010. There are 4 streets.

Geography 
Nizhne-Chufichevo is located 16 km south of Stary Oskol (the district's administrative centre) by road. Veliky Perevoz is the nearest rural locality.

References 

Rural localities in Starooskolsky District